Canville Creek is a stream in Neosho County, Kansas and Allen County, Kansas, in the United States.

Canville Creek was named for A. B. Canville, who settled near its banks in 1847.

See also
List of rivers of Kansas

References

Rivers of Allen County, Kansas
Rivers of Neosho County, Kansas
Rivers of Kansas